Eroticoscincus is a genus of skinks from Queensland, Australia. It is monotypic, the sole species being Eroticoscincus graciloides.

References

Fauna of Queensland
Skinks of Australia
Monotypic lizard genera
Taxa named by Richard Walter Wells
Taxa named by Cliff Ross Wellington